Arthur Rousseau (February 4, 1900 – October 30, 1994) was a Canadian politician and a former Mayor of Trois-Rivières.

Background

In 1926, he married Anaïs Allard-Rousseau, co-founder of the Jeunesses Musicales du Canada. They had seven children. In 1927, he opened a funeral home.

Achievements

In 1946, he endowed Trois-Rivières its first public library.

Footnotes

1900 births
1994 deaths
Mayors of Trois-Rivières